Barendrecht is a town and municipality in the west of the Netherlands, near Rotterdam, South Holland.

The municipality of Barendrecht also includes Barendrecht-Carnisselande and Smitshoek.

History
The name "Barendrecht" is derived from the Germanic word birni, translated as "mud" or "muddy", and the Latin word trāiectum translated as "to cross (a river)" to denote a muddy river crossing.

The current municipality of Barendrecht is located in the area of three former fiefdoms: East-Barendrecht, West-Barendrecht, and Carnisse. The oldest reference to East-Barendrecht is from 1264. These fiefdoms were in Riederwaard, an area reclaimed from water since the 12th century but had to deal with frequent dike breaches throughout the 13th and 14th centuries. Further stages in land reclamation, constituting the major part of modern Barendrecht, were the Binnenland polder (1484), Buitenland polder (1555) and Zuidpolder (1649).

During the French Period, the three fiefdoms were merged into one municipality Barendrecht. After the French Period, it was split into East and West-Barendrecht, but in 1836 it was again united as one municipality.

Demographics

The population of Barendrecht increased ten-fold in the last 80 years from just under 5,000 in 1930 to close to 50,000 in 2010. During this time the number of homes increased as well, there was an eight-fold increase in the number of homes in the last 50 years from 2,200 in 1961 to 18,400 in 2011. The overall population increased, whereas the number of persons per household decreased. This is consistent with the general trend in the Netherlands over this period.

In 2021, Barendrecht had a population of 48,771, of which 23,231 were male (49.4%) and 23,825 female (50.6%). According to the civil registry, 21% of its population were under the age of 14, 11% were between 15 and 24 years old, 27% were from 25 to 44, 28% were from 45 to 64 and 13% were 65 years of age or older. The marital status of the municipality was distributed such that 46% of its population was married, 45% never married, 6% divorced and 4% widowed. 26,08% of the population of Barendrecht was from foreign origin. The foreign origin of the municipality was 7,99% Western, 4% Suriname, 3% Turkey, 2% Morocco, 1% Dutch Caribbean and 8,81% from other countries.

Barendrecht had 18,615 households in 2012, this corresponds to an average of 2.5 persons per household. Of these households, 24% were made up of individuals, 30% were couples with no children under 18 living with them and 45% contained children under 18.

Geography

Subdivisions
Municipalities are the lowest tier of public administration in the Netherlands. They are, however, further subdivided into districts (wijken) and neighbourhoods (buurten) for administrative use. Barendrecht is subdivided into 23 districts, of which 20 are residential, two rural and one all business parks combined. The latter three have the lowest population density and largest area of all districts. The district with the highest population is Meerwede in Vinex-location Carnisselande, this district also has the highest population density. Each district is further subdivided in neighbourhoods. Some district consist of one neighbourhood, others consist of up to 14 neighbourhoods; the rural and business park districts are subdivided the most.

Sports
Barendrecht is home to two football clubs; BVV Barendrecht, which plays at the fourth level of the Dutch football pyramid, and VV Smitshoek which plays at the fifth tier of the football pyramid. BVV Barendrecht won the KNVB Amateur Cup in the 2008–09 season, they were banned from the 2011–12 KNVB Cup after winning their first round matchup. In addition to these clubs there are also numerous other sport clubs, including organized badminton, basketball, handball, hockey, korfball, tennis, track and field, volleyball and water polo. Due to its proximity to Rotterdam, Barendrecht occasionally is the scene for road events starting or finishing in Rotterdam, it is the penultimate municipality on the route of the  annual Paris-Rotterdam relay run.

Athletes from Barendrecht have also had individual success, mostly notably quadruple Olympic swimming champion Inge de Bruijn. She won four gold medals, two silver medals and two bronze medals in the freestyle and butterfly events at the 2000 and 2004 Summer Olympics. During her career she won a total of 36 medals in major competitions, 18 of these medals were gold. She has also held three world records in long course swimming. Several players on the Dutch water polo teams during the 1984 and 2000 Summer Olympics were from Barendrecht as well.

Government 
Barendrecht, as all Dutch municipalities, is ruled by both a board of mayor and aldermen and a municipal council. The municipal council is elected every four years. The number of councillors varies over time due to changes in the municipal population. It is the highest administrative body in the municipality and controls public policy. The executive power lies with the executive board, which consists of a mayor and multiple aldermen. The mayor is appointed by the crown and the alderman are elected by the municipal council, typically after each municipal election. Thieu van de Wouw, member of the CDA party, was major of Barendrecht from 1989 to his retirement in 2005. Jan van Belzen was appointed as mayor in July 2005, Van Belzen was mayor of Graafstroom before taking the same function in Barendrecht. In 2011 Van Belzen was appointed for another six-year term as mayor. The municipal council has traditionally been contested by national parties, the first local party was founded for the 2014 elections. The local representation per party typically changed with the national fortunes of these parties. The municipal elections of 2014 had the following results: the local party Our Interest Barendrecht won nine out of 29 seats, Christian Democratic Appeal won the largest share of the popular vote of all national parties in that election. Our Interest Barendrecht won also the elections of 2018 but did not participate in the local government. They also won the elections of 2022, but this time they are the only party governing the municipality.

Most policy decisions by the municipality do not garner widespread attention. Barendrecht is faced with the same issues as other suburban municipalities in providing public services and managing land-use planning. To study industrial scale carbon capture and storage methods, large-scale demonstration projects have been suggested to study what happens – the safety and other effects can only be fully studied in large-scale experiments. In 2007 it was suggested to inject  of carbon dioxide  underground in former gas fields in Barendrecht. Earlier studies had suggested to avoid trials in densely populated areas, such as Barendrecht, to eliminate the risk of a repeat of the Lake Nyos disaster. The suggestion to make Barendrecht a test site was met with local criticism, because of the experimental nature of the plan and because no ongoing monitoring of the fields would be performed. The municipal council of Barendrecht rejected the plan in June 2009 after their concerns were not met. The central government initially opted to overrule the council; they reversed their opinion in October 2010 and cancelled the plan.

Infrastructure

Road
Two Dutch motorways pass through Barendrecht:

 The A15 runs west to east along the northern part of the town and is part of the Rotterdam ring road. Its exit at IJsselmonde is located in the north-east of Barendrecht.
 The A29 runs north to south and divides Smitshoek and Carnisselande from the rest of Barendrecht. Its exit at Barendrecht is located in the south of the municipality. South of Barendrecht, it passes through the Heinenoordtunnel under the Oude Maas.

Vaanplein, the interchange between the A15 and A29, is situated within the borders of Barendrecht.

Rail
A number of railways pass through Barendrecht:

 The Breda–Rotterdam railway, originally known as Staatslijn I when it opened in 1872, runs along the east side of Barendrecht. The Barendrecht railway station is located on this line; it was initially opened in 1872 before moving to its current location in 2001.
 The HSL-Zuid is the high-speed rail line between Amsterdam and the Belgium border passing through Rotterdam. The southern section of the dedicated line branches off from the conventional line just north of Barendrecht and runs parallel to it through the town, but trains do not stop.
 The Betuweroute, a double track freight railway from Rotterdam to Germany, runs along the north and eastern sides of Barendrecht, at one point paralleling the passenger line and HSL-Zuid. Queen Beatrix opened this route in 2007.

The nine tracks of all three of these lines, which run through the railway station, are covered over a length of 1.5 km (0.9 mi) to reduce the noise to the surrounding neighbourhoods. Nederlandse Spoorwegen services the station, with trains departing towards Dordrecht to the southeast and Rotterdam to the northwest four times an hour during the day during weekdays, reduced to two times an hour during the rest of the railways' normal service hours.

A major junction between the three railway lines north of the station was the site of a train accident in 2009. Two freight trains collided head on, killing one of the drivers and serious injuring another. A passenger train could not stop in time and collided with the wreckage.

Local public transit
As a suburb of Rotterdam, commuters in Barendrecht have access to extensive local transport services operated by RET, whose tram line 25 runs north-south through the western part of Barendrecht with its southern terminus in Carnisselande. The tram runs to the Rotterdam Centraal railway station through the city centre and beyond to its northern terminus in Schiebroek.

The RET also operates several bus lines through Barendrecht:

 three lines, via different routes, from the railway station to Zuidplein,
 a line from the railway station to Kralingse Zoom,
 a short local route from Zuidplein to the Barendrecht community of Smitshoek, and
 another short line departing from the east side of the railway station.

Arriva runs two additional bus lines: a line from city hall to the Heinenoord bus terminal, and a line from the Barendrecht railway station to the Zwijndrecht railway station.

Notable people

 Jack van den Berg (born 1959), trainer for major "amateur" clubs, won the Rinus Michels Award
 Inge de Bruijn (born 1973), former competitive swimmer, four-time Olympic champion and former world record-holder
 Anwar El Ghazi (born 1995), professional footballer, plays for both the Dutch national team and Premier League club Aston Villa
 Chayenne Ewijk (born 1988), former professional tennis player
 Anton Heiden (born 1960), former water polo player, participated in the 1984 Summer Olympics 
 Finn Stokkers (born 1996), professional footballer with over 100 club caps
 Ties Theeuwkens (born 1985), professional basketball player, played 55 games for Dutch national basketball team
 Liz Weima (born 1968), former professional golfer

Gallery

References

External links

Official website

 
Municipalities of South Holland
Populated places in South Holland
IJsselmonde (island)